Mount Ditte is a mountain,  high, surmounting Cape Alexandra in the southeast extremity of Adelaide Island. It was discovered by the French Antarctic Expedition, 1908–10, and named by Jean-Baptiste Charcot for Alfred Ditte, a noted French chemist.

References 

Mountains of Adelaide Island